Luttrell is an unincorporated community in Fayette County, in the U.S. state of Ohio.

History
A post office was established at Luttrell in 1900, and remained in operation until 1903. Luttell once had its own school.

References

Unincorporated communities in Fayette County, Ohio
Unincorporated communities in Ohio